National Savings Certificates, popularly known as NSC, is an Indian Government savings bond, primarily used for small savings and income tax saving investments in India. It is part of the postal savings system of India Post.

These can be purchased from any Post Office in India by an adult (either in his/her own name or on behalf of a minor), a minor, a trust, and two adults jointly. These are issued for five and ten year maturity and can be pledged to banks as collateral for availing loans. The holder gets the tax benefit under Section 80C of Income Tax Act, 1961.

Other similar government savings schemes in India include: Public Provident Fund (PPF), Post Office Fixed Deposit, Post Office Recurring Deposit, etc. The certificates were heavily promoted by the Indian government in the 1950s after India's independence, to collect funds for nation-building

Discontinuation of Physical Certificate 
As of April 2016, Ministry of Finance enabled purchasing and redeeming of these bonds in electronic form and financial institutions no longer issue a physical pre-printed certificate.

See Also
National Savings Schemes

References

External links

 National Savings Certificates (NSC) at India Post
 Revision of interest rates for small savings schemes 26 March 2012
 Revision of interest rates for small savings schemes 31 March 2015
 Revision of interest rates for small savings schemes 29 September 2017
 Revision of interest rates for small savings schemes 27 December 2017
 Revision of interest rates for small savings schemes 28 March 2018

Tax-advantaged savings plans in India
Postal system of India
Government bonds issued by India
Postal savings system